Josh LaBerge is an American mixed martial artist. A professional from 2007 until 2017, he fought in Strikeforce, Bellator and CES MMA.

Background
Born and raised in Fall River, Massachusetts, LaBerge often was involved in street fights growing up, and once spent 90 days in jail for assault. Upon being released, LaBerge was involved in a fight while defending a relative, and was stabbed, causing a punctured lung and he was sent to the hospital in critical condition.  LaBerge attended Durfee High School.

Mixed martial arts career

Early career
After winning an amateur bout, LaBerge made his professional debut in late 2007. Facing 3-0 Andrew Carron, LaBerge was defeated via second-round TKO. Compiling a record of 5-4, LaBerge fought for the vacant Reality Fighting Featherweight Championship against champion Mike Gresh. LaBerge won via unanimous decision.

Bellator and Strikeforce
LaBerge made his second Bellator appearance at Bellator 17, against Dan Bonnell, whom he had previously defeated via first-round TKO. LaBerge won again, with a knockout in only 48 seconds. 

After the win over Bonnell, LaBerge appeared for Strikeforce at Strikeforce: Fedor vs. Silva against Anthony Leone. In the biggest win of his career to date, LaBerge upset the future UFC veteran via doctor stoppage at the end of the first round.

2-0 under the Bellator banner, LaBerge fought again in the promotion at Bellator 134 against Connecticut native Matt Bessette. LaBerge was defeated via doctor stoppage at the end of the second round.

CES MMA
In 2016, LaBerge returned to the cage for the CES MMA promotion, based out of Rhode Island. Fighting now as a lightweight, LaBerge defeated Ran Weathers via unanimous decision at CES MMA 35. Two months later at CES 36, LaBerge won again via second-round TKO against Jonathan Lemke.

At CES MMA 42, LaBerge faced jiu-jitsu specialist and boxer Saul Almeida, losing via third-round submission.

LaBerge last fought in October of 2017, losing in a rematch with Lemke via unanimous decision.

Personal life
Aside from his career as a fighter, LaBerge works part time as a mason.

Mixed martial arts record

|-
| Loss
| align=center| 11-7
| Jon Lemke
| Decision (unanimous)
| CES MMA 46: Howard vs. Carroll
| 
| align=center| 3
| align=center| 5:00
| Lincoln, Rhode Island, United States
| 
|-
| Loss
| align=center| 11-6
| Saul Almeida
| Submission (rear-naked choke)
| CES MMA 42: Curtis vs. Santiago Jr.
| 
| align=center| 3
| align=center| 4:50
| Lincoln, Rhode Island, United States
| 
|-
| Win
| align=center| 11-5
| Jon Lemke
| TKO (punches)
| CES MMA 36: Andrews vs. Muro
| 
| align=center| 2
| align=center| 1:11
| Lincoln, Rhode Island, United States
| 
|-
| Win
| align=center| 10-5
| Ran Weathers
| Decision (unanimous)
| CES MMA 35: Jeudi vs. Gonzalez
| 
| align=center| 3
| align=center| 5:00
| Beverly, Massachusetts, United States
|Return to Lightweight.
|-
| Loss
| align=center| 9-5
| Matt Bessette
| TKO (doctor stoppage)
| Bellator 134: The British Invasion
| 
| align=center| 2
| align=center| 5:00
| Uncasville, Connecticut, United States
| 
|-
| Win
| align=center| 9-4
| Steve McCabe
| KO (knees)
| Classic Entertainment and Sports: CES MMA 22
| 
| align=center| 1
| align=center| 0:37
| Lincoln, Rhode Island, United States
|Catchweight (150 lb) bout.
|-
| Win
| align=center| 8-4
| Anthony Leone
| TKO (doctor stoppage)
| Strikeforce: Fedor vs. Silva
| 
| align=center| 1
| align=center| 5:00
| East Rutherford, New Jersey, United States
| 
|-
| Win
| align=center| 7-4
| Dan Bonnell
| TKO (punches)
| Bellator XVII
| 
| align=center| 1
| align=center| 0:48
| Boston, Massachusetts, United States
| 
|-
| Win
| align=center| 6-4
| Mike Gresh
| Decision (unanimous)
| Reality Fighting: Detonation
| 
| align=center| 3
| align=center| 5:00
| Plymouth, Massachusetts, United States
|Won the Reality Fighting Featherweight Championship.
|-
| Win
| align=center| 5-4
| Dan Bonnell
| TKO (punches)
| WCF: World Championship Fighting 8
| 
| align=center| 1
| align=center| 1:20
| Wilmington, Massachusetts, United States
|Return to Featherweight.
|-
| Win
| align=center| 4-4
| Chris Simmons
| Decision (unanimous)
| Bellator II
| 
| align=center| 3
| align=center| 5:00
| Norman, Oklahoma, United States
| 
|-
| Win
| align=center| 3-4
| Frank Latina
| Decision (split)
| USFL: Springfield Massacre
| 
| align=center| 3
| align=center| 5:00
| Springfield, Massachusetts, United States
|Lightweight debut.
|-
| Loss
| align=center| 2-4
| Aguilano Brandao
| Submission (armbar)
| FFP: Untamed 26
| 
| align=center| 1
| align=center| 1:22
| Westport, Massachusetts, United States
| 
|-
| Loss
| align=center| 2-3
| Jon Owens
| KO (knee)
| EVO MMA: Fight Night For The Kids
| 
| align=center| 1
| align=center| 0:40
| Charlotte, North Carolina, United States
| 
|-
| Win
| align=center| 2-2
| Barrington Douse
| Decision (split)
| USFL: War in the Woods 5
| 
| align=center| 3
| align=center| 5:00
| Ledyard, Connecticut, United States
| 
|-
| Loss
| align=center| 1-2
| Adailton Reis
| TKO (punches)
| ICE Fighter: ICE Fighter
| 
| align=center| 3
| align=center| 0:24
| Worcester, Massachusetts, United States
| 
|-
| Win
| align=center| 1-1
| Joe Rizzo
| Submission (rear-naked choke)
| ICE Fighter: Dead Man Walking
| 
| align=center| 1
| align=center| 0:55
| Worcester, Massachusetts, United States
| 
|-
| Loss
| align=center| 0-1
| Andrew Carron
| TKO (punches)
| ICE Fighter: Put Up or Shut Up
| 
| align=center| 2
| align=center| 2:08
| Worcester, Massachusetts, United States
|Catchweight (150 lb) bout.

See also
List of male mixed martial artists

References

External links
 

American male mixed martial artists
Featherweight mixed martial artists
Lightweight mixed martial artists
Living people
Year of birth missing (living people)